Anders Järryd was the defending champion, but lost in the quarterfinals this year.

Mats Wilander won the title, defeating Broderick Dyke 6–2, 6–3 in the final.

Seeds

  Mats Wilander (champion)
  Boris Becker (first round)
  Joakim Nyström (semifinals)
  Anders Järryd (quarterfinals)
  Miloslav Mečíř (semifinals)
  Kevin Curren (quarterfinals)
  Henri Leconte (first round)
  Henrik Sundström (first round)

Draw

Finals

Top half

Bottom half

References

 Main Draw

1986 Grand Prix (tennis)
Donnay Indoor Championships